This article lists the presidents of the Congress of New Caledonia since 1985. The President serves as the head, or speaker, of the Congress of New Caledonia.

Presidents of the Territorial Assembly

Presidents of the Congress

See also

Politics of New Caledonia

References

Congress of New Caledonia

Congress, Presidents
New Caledonia, Congress